Guy Bertrand Ngon Mamoun (born November 4, 1983 in Metet, Yaoundé) is a Cameroonian footballer who plays as a midfielder for Persik Kediri.

External links 
 
 Profile at liga-indonesia.co.id

1983 births
Living people
Cameroonian footballers
Expatriate footballers in Indonesia
Gresik United players
Association football midfielders